Nemanja Mladenović may refer to:
Nemanja Mladenović (footballer, born 1993), Serbian association football midfielder, who plays for Zemun
Nemanja Mladenović (footballer, born 1996), Serbian association football centre-back
Nemanja Mladenović (handballer) (born 1994), Serbian handball player